John Lathrop may refer to:

 Jack Lathrop (John Marcus Lathrop, 1913–1987), jazz guitarist and vocalist
 John Lothropp (1584–1653), British clergy
 John Lathrop (American minister) (1740–1816), of Boston, Mass
 John Hiram Lathrop (1799–1866), educator
 John W. Lathrop (born 1960),California Army National Guard general
 John Lathrop (judge) (1833–1910), associate justice of the Massachusetts Supreme Judicial Court